Lee Tim-sing (born 1949) is a Hong Kong television producer, director and writer.

Career 
After graduating from  secondary school, Lee joined Television Broadcasts Limited (TVB) in 1969 as a set decorator. He became a director in 1975 and was promoted to a producer a few years later. Lee was also known for making cameo appearances in several television productions, including a guest appearance in an episode of the variety program Enjoy Yourself Tonight as "Street-sweeper Mau", a role for which he later became known.

In the early 1980s and late 1990s, Lee achieved great success in the genres of wuxia and action thrillers. Many of Lee's television productions also contributed to the popularity of rising actors of their time, such as Chow Yun-fat, Carol Cheng, Felix Wong, Andy Lau, Tony Leung and, recently, Wayne Lai. Most of Lee's works are produced by TVB.

In 2016, at the age of 68, Lee Tim-sing announced his retirement, ending his 48-year long career with TVB.

Filmography

As director

As producer

References

External links
南方網
香港電影資料館 – 李添勝
香港影庫 – 李添勝

1949 births
Hong Kong film directors
Hong Kong screenwriters
TVB producers
Living people
Hong Kong people